Norah Howard (12 December 1900 - 2 May 1968) was a British actress of stage and screen.

Biography
She was born as Norah Lillian Emily Smeed on 12 December 1900, in Fulham, London, England, her father was Alfred Howard Smeed. She changed her stage name from Smeed to Howard, adopting her father's middle name. Her theatre work included the original West End productions of Cole Porter's Nymph Errant and Frank Vosper's Love from a Stranger (1936); and on Broadway, the revival of Noël Coward's Tonight at 8.30 (1948).
Norah died on 2 May 1968 in New York, New York, USA.

Selected filmography
 The W Plan (1930)
 A Cuckoo in the Nest (1933)
 Love, Life and Laughter (1934)
 Car of Dreams (1935)
 Fighting Stock (1935)
 The Big Noise (1936)
 I've Got a Horse (1938)
 Star of the Circus (1938)
 The Saint in London (1939)
 The Lambeth Walk (1939)
 An Englishman's Home (1940)
 Two Loves (1961)

References

External links
 

1900 births
1968 deaths
British stage actresses
British film actresses
Actresses from London
People from Fulham
20th-century British actresses
20th-century English women
20th-century English people